Fin Hoeata (born 28 December 1996) is a New Zealand rugby union player who plays for the  in the Super Rugby competition.  His position of choice is lock.

References 

New Zealand rugby union players
1996 births
Living people
Rugby union locks
Taranaki rugby union players
Chiefs (rugby union) players